This is a summary of 1909 in music in the United Kingdom.

Events
22 September - 11-year-old pianist Marie Novello makes her Proms début, playing the Piano Concerto no. 1 in E-flat by Franz Liszt.
date unknown - Ada Jones records her most popular song, "The Yama Yama Man", for the Victor Light Opera Company.

Popular music
"Boiled Beef and Carrots" by Charles Collins and Fred Murray
"Master Kilby"; traditional folk song collected by Cecil Sharp and Maud Karpeles
"The King's Way" by Edward Elgar and Caroline Alice Elgar

New recordings
Mark Sheridan - "I Do Like To be Beside the Seaside"

Classical music: new works
Arnold Bax – In the Faery Hills
Gustav Holst – First Suite in E-flat for Military Band
John Blackwood McEwen – A Solway Symphony
Ralph Vaughan Williams – The Wasps

Opera
Fallen Fairies by W. S. Gilbert and Edward German
The Mountaineers, by Guy Eden and Reginald Somerville

Musical theatre
29 April – The Arcadians, with book by Mark Ambient and Alexander M. Thompson, lyrics by Arthur Wimperis, and music by Lionel Monckton and Howard Talbot, opens at the Shaftesbury Theatre in London, where it runs for 809 performances.

Births
1 May – George Melachrino, conductor, singer and composer (died 1965)
11 May – Herbert Murrill, organist and composer (died 1952)
12 June - Mansel Thomas, composer and conductor (died 1986)
25 August - Arwel Hughes, composer (died 1988)

Deaths
4 February – James Lynam Molloy, poet, songwriter and composer, 71
7 June – P. W. Halton, conductor, 68

See also
 1909 in the United Kingdom

References

British Music, 1909 in
Music
British music by year
1900s in British music